Dover is an unincorporated community in Jefferson Township, Boone County, in the U.S. state of Indiana.

History
A post office was established at Dover in 1860, and remained in operation until it was discontinued in 1872.

Geography

References

Unincorporated communities in Boone County, Indiana
Unincorporated communities in Indiana